is a Japanese long jumper who won a bronze medal at the 2017 Asian Championships. He placed fifth at the 2018 Asian Games.

In 2019, he competed in the men's long jump at the 2019 World Athletics Championships held in Doha, Qatar. He finished in 11th place.

References

Japanese male long jumpers
1995 births
Living people
Tokai University alumni
Athletes (track and field) at the 2018 Asian Games
Asian Games competitors for Japan
Athletes (track and field) at the 2020 Summer Olympics
Olympic athletes of Japan